Nyctegretis ruminella is a species of snout moth. It is found in France, Spain, on Sardinia, Corsica and Sicily and in Romania and Bulgaria.

References

Moths described in 1860
Phycitini
Moths of Europe
Moths of Asia